This is Statistics of China women's volleyball club Guangdong Evergrande

Team Roster

Team member 2009-2010
Head coach: Lang Ping

Team member 2010-2011
Head coach: Lang Ping

Team member 2011-2012
Head coach: Lang Ping

Best Scorer History

External links
 2009-2010 season
 2010-2011 season
 2011-2012 season

Volleyball in China